The women's 800 metre freestyle competition of the swimming events at the 2011 World Aquatics Championships was held on July 29 with the heats and July 30 with the final.

Records
Prior to the competition, the existing world and championship records were as follows.

Results

Heats
32 swimmers participated in 5 heats.

Final
The final was held at 19:30.

References

External links
2011 World Aquatics Championships: Women's 800 metre freestyle start list, from OmegaTiming.com; retrieved 2011-07-23.

Freestyle 0800 metre, women's
World Aquatics Championships
2011 in women's swimming